Karin Engdahl (born 1972) is a Swedish politician (Social Democrat). , she serves as member of the Riksdag representing the constituency of Västra Götaland County North, following the resignation of Jörgen Hellman.

References 

Living people
1972 births
Place of birth missing (living people)
Members of the Riksdag from the Social Democrats
Members of the Riksdag 2018–2022
21st-century Swedish politicians
21st-century Swedish women politicians
Women members of the Riksdag